Meijer Inc. (stylized as meijer) is an American supercenter chain that primarily operates throughout the Midwestern United States. Its corporate headquarters are in Walker, Michigan, which is a part of the Grand Rapids metropolitan area. Founded in 1934 as a supermarket chain, Meijer is credited with pioneering the modern supercenter concept in 1962. About half of the company's 253 stores are located in Michigan; the others are in Illinois, Indiana, Kentucky, Ohio, and Wisconsin. The chain is ranked by Forbes as the 13th-largest private company in the United States, and is the country's 21st-largest retailer by revenue as of 2020.

History

Meijer was founded as Meijer's in Greenville, Michigan, in 1934 by Hendrik Meijer, a Dutch immigrant. Meijer was a local barber who entered the grocery business during the Great Depression. His first employees included his 14-year-old son, Frederik Meijer, who later became chairman of the company.  The current co-chairmen, brothers Hank and Doug Meijer, are Hendrik's grandsons. After studying trends in the grocery industry, Meijer was among the first stores to offer self-service shopping and shopping carts. He also offered staple items, such as vinegar, at bargain prices.

The Greenville store was successful and additional Meijer groceries were opened in Cedar Springs (1942) and Ionia (1946). The first Grand Rapids store opened on South Division Avenue in 1949. By the 1960s, the company had over two dozen stores located throughout West Michigan.

In 1962 Meijer launched its modern format with a store at the corner of 28th Street and Kalamazoo Avenue in Grand Rapids. New stores were built in the same manner until the mid-1970s, when an architect mentioned the extra cost to management. This was followed by the first Mid-Michigan location in Delta Charter Township, Michigan, in 1966 and the first Metro Detroit store in Ypsilanti, Michigan, in 1972. Meijer expanded into Northern Michigan with their 33rd location in Traverse City opening in 1977.

Fred Meijer took over the company upon his father's death in 1964.  Under his leadership, the Thrifty Acres stores became a success and were renamed Meijer in 1986. Meijer's stand-alone grocery operations continued until the early 1990s, as the larger stores became dominant. In 1985 Forbes magazine reported Walmart at the time had failed in what were then known as hypermarkets because Sam Walton and company did not understand the grocery business.

Walton launched the first Hypermart USA store in 1987, opening only four stores, the last in 1990. An article in Forbes Magazine said Meijer understood the importance of the food business, and it was not something just tacked onto a discount store. The quality of the produce is very important; poor-quality produce sold by Walmart was the main reason for their lack of success. By contrast, surveys said then and now that Meijer ranks high on produce quality.

During the mid-1990s, Meijer expanded to three additional states. The first location in Indiana opened on Grape Road in Mishawaka on April 19, 1994, followed by the first Illinois store in Champaign (Store #146) on April 4, 1995. In 1996, the first regular Kentucky Meijer location in opened Florence, along with four nearby locations in Ohio which were Fairfield, Loveland, West Chester and Eastgate North Drive in Cincinnati. This also marked the chain's reentry into that state. Two more Kentucky locations would open on Paul Jones Way in Lexington and Towne Center Drive in Louisville in 1997. In 1998 three new Meijer locations opened in the Louisville area on Dixie Highway, Preston Highway and South Hurstbourne Parkway.

The first Meijer location in the Northwest Indiana region opened in August 1997 in Michigan City. Following this, the Merrillville location opened to the public on August 4, 1998, while the Highland location officially opened on April 20, 1999. The first Meijer location in the Chicago region opened on August 3, 1999 on Weber Road in Bolingbrook. A year later in 2000, three Illinois Meijer locations would open in Aurora, St. Charles and Springfield. Another Meijer store in Bolingbrook opened on Boughton Road by The Promenade in May 2002, three years after the Weber Road location.

With the increasing dominance of Walmart throughout the country during the 1990s and up to the present, Meijer is facing the effects of an intensely competitive retail industry. In late 2003 the company laid off 350 people from the corporate offices, distribution centers and field offices; a few months later, in January 2004, Meijer laid off 1,896 employees and managerial staff, leading to speculation that the company was losing profitability and market share. A marketing professor, Dr. Ben Rudolph of Grand Valley State University near Meijer's corporate headquarters, lambasted this move, saying they "apparently blinked" and that Meijer's "decision was driven by panic".  Continuing cutbacks in 2006, the company outsourced 81 information technology positions to India.

In 2003, the company announced that all new Meijer stores would feature an entirely new format and company image, complete with a new logo intended to make the Meijer stores seem "friendly" and inviting. The company hired New York City's Rockwell Group to redesign the existing stores and establish a design for new stores. The "new theatrics" for the then-71-year-old company originally started as a "new product introduction program" until David Rockwell talked Hank and Fred Meijer into further changes. Rockwell told the Meijers the new introduction program would "work only if it was part of a new overall creative foundation based on a fresher, younger approach, encompassing architecture, interior design, and graphic design". In 2005, despite cutbacks, Meijer embarked on an expansion plan to increase its number of stores in Illinois, Michigan, and Ohio. In April 2003 Meijer selected DeVito/Verdi, an award-winning advertising agency in New York, to handle its $25-million account.

In May 2007, the first LEED-certified Meijer store opened in the second phase of the Fairlane Green development in Allen Park, Michigan. In July 2007 Meijer announced to the Michigan press it would be "restructuring" its Team Leader management positions in all 181 stores, stating layoffs would be "minimal" and necessary "to handle more sophisticated products such as flat-screen TVs and high-priced wines". Their spokesperson also said the changes were "not about a labor reduction", but fitting people into the right roles. No corporate staff or hourly workers were directly affected.  In August 2007, the store announced they were cutting about 500 managers (12% of existing management staff). The 500 were given severance packages, while other managers were transferred to other stores or "reassigned to different positions".

In 2009, the chain announced a new concept in the Chicago region called Meijer Marketplace which comprises smaller stores that focus more on grocery items and pharmacy. Four such stores were eventually opened, in Niles (2010), Orland Park (2010), Melrose Park (2011), and Berwyn (2012). The Niles store closed on June 18, 2016. The Melrose Park and Berwyn stores closed on June 17, 2017 (the Berwyn store space now houses Tony's Fresh Market, which had relocated from its previous location at the former Dominick's store in North Riverside in 2018), leaving the Orland Park store as the last remaining small-format Meijer in operation.

On November 25, 2011, Frederik Meijer died at the age of 91. In 2013, Meijer opened its 200th supercenter in Swartz Creek, Michigan.

Meijer opened its first store within the city of Detroit on July 25, 2013, and its second location within the city on June 11, 2015. Meijer opened its first locations in Wisconsin in June 2015. To help promote itself in Wisconsin, Meijer purchased a distribution center in Pleasant Prairie from SuperValu in 2012, and placed an advertisement along the outfield wall of Miller Park, home of the Milwaukee Brewers, in 2014 in anticipation of the company's expansion into Wisconsin.

Meijer bought the largely vacant Memorial Mall in Sheboygan, Wisconsin, in March 2015. Much of the existing structure was demolished, and replaced with a new store in April 2019.

In 2017, Meijer is expanding into the Cleveland–Akron market with stores in Stow, Mentor, and Avon. Meijer is also expanding into the Youngstown area with a store in Boardman, Ohio in 2020  as well as Austintown. 

In 2017–2018 Meijer expanded into the Northeastern Wisconsin market with stores in Howard and Grand Chute. The Howard location serves Green Bay with the Grand Chute location serving Appleton and the Fox Cities.

Operations

 

Meijer stores are classified as supercenters or hypermarkets (a superstore that combines groceries and department store goods in the same store). Many stores also feature an adjacent Meijer-branded gas station and convenience store. Several Meijer gas stations feature alternative fuels, such as E85, biodiesel, and compressed natural gas as well as electric vehicle charging stations.

Meijer has 259 stores in Michigan, Indiana, northern and central Illinois, central and western Ohio, and northern Kentucky. Before the COVID-19 pandemic, most Meijer stores were open 24 hours a day, 364 days a year, closing only at 7 p.m. on Christmas Eve, and reopening at 6 a.m. on December 26. In 2013 Meijer ranked No. 19 in Forbes list of top 20 Private Companies.

Other Meijer-owned stores
In addition to the original Meijer supermarkets and hypermarkets, Meijer opened several concept stores in the 1970s and 1980s. The first were specialty clothing store chains called Copper Rivet, Sagebrush, and Casual Court. Each store focused on a different form of brand-name clothing: Copper Rivet sold Levi's jeans, Sagebrush sold casual wear, and Casual Court sold women's clothing. All three chains usually operated in front of existing Meijer stores, or in nearby shopping centers. Casual Court was renamed Tansy in 1982. These clothing chains were dissolved in the 1980s as brand-name clothing became more readily available at competing retailers. Sagebrush, which at its peak comprised 71 stores, was sold off in 1988, while Copper Rivet and Tansy stores were closed as their leases expired.

In 1980, Meijer began a discount pharmacy chain called Spaar (from the Dutch word for "save"), which opened four stores in 1980 in former Meijer supermarket locations. The Spaar stores were sold to Pontiac, Michigan-based Perry Drug Stores by the mid-1980s.

One year after launching the Spaar brand, in 1981, Meijer began opening Meijer Square stores, which were traditional discount department stores lacking a full grocery section. Fourteen locations of Buffalo, New York-based Twin Fair, predominantly in southwestern Ohio, were bought and converted to the Meijer Square name. Two Meijer Square stores were also opened in Michigan. The Ohio locations were largely sold to Zayre and Hills. Meijer returned to Cincinnati and soon Kentucky in May 1996, after both Hills and Ames had closed all of their Ohio stores.

Meijer opened its first warehouse club store, SourceClub, in 1992. The concept proved unsuccessful in competition against Sam's Club and Costco, and all seven SourceClub stores were closed in 1994. The location in Fraser, Michigan, was converted to a regular Meijer store, while the rest were shuttered or sold off.

Small-format markets

In 2018, Meijer opened Bridge Street Market, a  concept grocery store in Grand Rapids. It was followed by three similar markets: Woodward Corner Market in Royal Oak, Michigan (2020); Capital City Market in Lansing (2020); and Rivertown Market in Detroit (2021). A fifth, Fairfax Market, is currently under construction in Cleveland, slated for opening in 2023.

Meijer Grocery 

Introduced in 2023, Meijer Grocery is a standard-sized grocery store concept. The first two locations, in Lake Orion and Macomb Township, Michigan, opened on January 26, 2023.

Fresh Thyme Farmers Market

During the 2010s, Meijer appeared to control or own the regional organic food supermarket chain Fresh Thyme Farmers Market, but official records were not very clear about the relationship between the two companies. After the founder, Chris Sherrell, left the company, the CEO from 2019 to 2022 was a prior Meijer executive. The CEO as of July 2022 has no prior ties to Meijer, instead having a background working with Kroger and Aldi. 

In September 2020, Fresh Thyme announced that it was withdrawing from the state of Nebraska by closing its remaining three stores after closing two stores the previous year. The closures left the company with 70 stores in 10 states.

Marketing and sponsorship
In 2006, Meijer donated money to Calvin College in Grand Rapids, Michigan, to create the paid position called the Frederik Meijer Chair of Dutch Language and Culture. The previous chair was unpaid. Its purpose is to promote interest in the Netherlands and Michigan's Dutch cultural heritage.

In 2014, Meijer was the first retailer to accept both Apple Pay and CurrentC for purchases in its stores and gas stations despite possible penalties from Merchant Customer Exchange for accepting Apple Pay.

Store design

Meijer stores are typically designed with the supermarket section to one side and the general merchandise section to the other side. The chain's stores are almost always constructed from the ground up, with very few Meijer stores having been converted from other retailers. Exceptions include the:

 Lincoln Park, Michigan and Portage, Indiana stores, both of which were former Super Kmart stores, though the latter was significantly renovated during conversion to Meijer
 Traverse City, Michigan store, a former Grant City store
 Sterling Heights, Michigan, the former location on Metropolitan Parkway (which relocated to Madison Heights, Michigan in 2002 and has been demolished for a shopping center), which was also a former Grant City, 
 Fraser, Michigan which Meijer converted from its failed SourceClub concept store
 Newark, Ohio (which was shuttered in 2013), which was one of the stores Meijer purchased from Twin Fair.

Some stores built in the 1960s and 1970s, including a since-demolished location on Pierson Road in Mount Morris Township, Michigan (which marked the chain's entry into the Flint market in 1972), included a balcony, containing service tenants such as a barber shop and nail salon. During the late 1990s, McDonald's restaurants also operated inside Meijer stores, primarily in those with balconies, though some locations without balconies like Taylor, Michigan and the location on Alexis Road in Toledo, Ohio also had McDonald's locations; in addition, the first stores in the Detroit area featured a short-lived fast food concept called Thrifty's Kitchen, which also operated a standalone location in front of the Meijer on Alpine Avenue in Walker. Most stores feature a sit-down café, while some also feature a Starbucks coffee shop or a Subway restaurant. Stores built between 1989 and 1993 featured a curved wall of windows that ran along the area between the entrances, examples include many early locations in Ohio and the Midland, Michigan store (many of these such stores have since been renovated into the current exterior design described below).

Early in the 1990s, Meijer developed new integrated prototypes for their rollouts.  One example was the "whimsical" design prototype introduced with the 1994 expansion into Indiana.  Different shapes and roofing designs created the facade of the building.  Most notable was the yellow pineapple constructed from yellow ceramic brick and glass blocks.  The different shapes on the facade were to introduce Meijer to Indiana as a "store of discovery".

Also notable was the use of a large translucent wall above the grand concourse facing the registers.  This allowed natural light to filter into the area above the registers without actual windows.  Another feature of these stores was the introduction of grey concrete panels and silver framing on windows and doors. Slight variations of this prototype were also introduced with the 1995 expansion into Illinois and the 1996 reentry into Kentucky.

On August 5, 1997, the store in Fort Gratiot Township, Michigan debuted a new prototype that evolved out of the mid-1990s prototype. This was the Presidential prototype, in which the logo was moved to the center of the building. Later Meijer stores of this design introduced the Meijer Fresh logo with the then-current Meijer logo and a large cursive "Fresh" on the right of the Meijer name. Most of these signs have since been phased out in favor of the current logo, with the lower case "meijer" (in red) with blue dots over the 'i' and 'j'. In the year 2000 the Presidential prototype was replaced with the Village Square prototype, which featured fake storefronts running across the front of the building and a barn-like section on which the Meijer logo was situated. That prototype, however, was soon replaced by the Signature Series prototype, which removed the fake storefronts, which itself was replaced in the mid-2000s with the current prototype, which features emphasis on the entrances, which feature towering glass walls with a tilted roof, resulting in an "eyebrow" appearance.

"Hypermarket"

Meijer was the first retailer to launch the "supermarket" or "superstore" in the US, combining a multitude of merchandise under one roof, when they opened the first Thrifty Acres in 1962. Meijer describes itself as a grocery chain that added general merchandise to their grocery stores in 1962.

Controversies and criticism

Acme Township, Michigan

In February 2007, Meijer was involved in an effort to recall the elected officials of Acme Township in Grand Traverse County, because of the officials' reluctance to allow a new store along M-72 within the rural township. Meijer retained Seyferth, Spaulding and Tennyson, a Grand Rapids public relations firm, to help orchestrate the recall effort.

Records indicate the PR firm retained by Meijer had arranged a meeting with a small nonprofit organization which favored the Meijer store, but had not yet formally taken a position on the recall. With the persuasion of the PR firm, the organization, known as the "Acme Taxpayers for Responsible Government", formed a recall committee and began to promote the recall election. Seyferth researched the plausibility of a recall, wrote justification for the recall and oversaw the agenda for the meeting with Acme Taxpayers. The PR firm revised the organization's website and logo, devised talking points and campaign literature, and wrote ghost letters to Traverse City newspapers. The recall committee did not disclose any of the PR firm's assistance, or its affiliation with Meijer. The company was fined $190,000 for its actions. The store eventually opened in 2015, with thousands attending the long-awaited grand opening.

Treatment of LGBT community
Meijer scored 0% on the 2008 Human Rights Campaign Corporate Equality Index, which is a measure of how U.S. companies and businesses are treating gay, lesbian, bisexual and transgender employees, consumers and investors. Meijer was one of only three companies out of over 500 graded to receive a score of 0.

In 2009, Meijer's score began to improve after the company amended its nondiscrimination policy to include sexual orientation. Other retail and grocery rivals' scores are Macy's Inc. (100%), Sears Holdings Corporation (100%), Target Corporation (100%), Whole Foods Market (90%), Kroger (75%), and Walmart (40%). By 2016, Meijer had improved their score to 85%, having a similar score to its rivals.

In 2020, Meijer's score improved to a 100% with the Human Rights Campaign's Corporate Equality Index, which joined 680 major U.S. businesses that also scored a 100% that year.

Firing of a Christian employee
The federal government sued Meijer on behalf of a former employee for violating her civil rights by firing her because she would not work on Sundays. Debra Kerkstra was fired in 2001 for refusing to work on Sunday because of religious convictions. The US Equal Employment Opportunity Commission accused Meijer of religious discrimination, and Meijer settled the case after paying $22,000 to Kerkstra and agreeing to implement procedures to prevent repeat occurrences.

See also

Citations

References

External links

 

1934 establishments in Michigan
Companies based in Grand Rapids, Michigan
Companies based in Kent County, Michigan
Discount stores of the United States
Economy of Kentucky
Economy of the Midwestern United States
Supermarkets of the United States
Superstores in the United States
Hypermarkets of the United States
Privately held companies based in Michigan
Retail companies established in 1934
Meijer family
Family-owned companies of the United States